was the Capital of Japan during most of the Nara period, from 710 to 740 and again from 745 to 784.  The imperial palace is a listed UNESCO World Heritage together with other places in the city of Nara (cf. Historic Monuments of Ancient Nara).

Empress Genmei ordered the Imperial capital moved from Fujiwara-kyō to Heijō-kyō in 708, and the move to Heijō-kyō was complete in 710. Heijō-kyō was modeled after Chang'an, the capital of Tang-dynasty China, although Heijō-kyō lacked walls. In the city, merchants and traders from China, Korea and India introduced various foreign cultures to Heijō-kyō through the Silk Road. As a result, Heijō-kyō flourished as Japan's first international and political capital, with a peak population of between 50,000 and 100,000. The overall form of the city was an irregular rectangle, and the area of city is more than 25 km2.

Architecture
In the area of Heijō-kyō, there are ancient Buddhist temples, and some temples are also listed as UNESCO World Heritage together with Heijō Palace.
 Daian-ji (大安寺)
 Yakushi-ji (薬師寺)
 Kōfuku-ji (興福寺)
 Gangō-ji (元興寺)
 Suzakumon (朱雀門, reconstruction) 
 Saidai-ji (西大寺)
 Tōdai-ji (東大寺)
 Daikokuden (大極殿, reconstruction)

1,300th anniversary
The year 2010 marked the passage of 1,300 years since the establishment of Nara Heijō-kyō. Commemorative events of the 1,300th anniversary of Nara Heijō-kyō Capital (Japanese:平城遷都1300年祭) were held in and around Nara Prefecture from April 24 to November 7, 2010. These events included special displays of national treasures and other cultural properties, walking events that explore famous places in Nara and traditional events in various places throughout Nara.

 Main Event Site – Heijō-kyō Capital Area (平城宮跡)
　　　A：Entrance Plaza
　　　　　●Heijō Palace Site Tour Center
　　　　　●Corporate Participation Hall
　　　B：Heijō History Museum/Full-Scale Replica of Japanese Diplomatic Ship for Envoys to Tang China
　　　C：Suzaku Gate Plaza
　　　　　●Suzaku Gate
　　　D：Exchange Plaza
　　　　　●Mahoroba Stage
　　　　　●Exchange Hall
　　　E：Heijō Palace Site Museum
　　　F：Front Courtyard of the Former Imperial Audience Hall
　　　G：South Gate Plaza
　　　　　●Tempyo period costume rental area
　　　H：Heijō-kyō  Hands-on Learning Plaza
　　　　　●Heijō-kyō Hands-on Learning Center
　　　　　●Ministry of the Imperial Household
　　　I：Excavation Site Exhibition Hall
　　　J：Eastern Palace Garden Plaza
　　　　　●Eastern Palace Garden

 Other Events Site
　　　Ikaruga and Shigi-san Areas (cf. Ikaruga, 斑鳩・信貴山)
　　　Asuka and Fujiwara Areas (cf. Asuka, 飛鳥・藤原)
　　　Katsuragi Area (葛城)
　　　Yoshino Area (cf. Mount Yoshino, 吉野)
　　　Yamato Kogen Plains and Uda Area (大和高原・宇陀)

See also
List of Special Places of Scenic Beauty, Special Historic Sites and Special Natural Monuments
Heijō Palace – Imperial palace
Historic Monuments of Ancient Nara –  UNESCO World Heritage Site

References

 Yoko Hsueh Shirai. Envisioning Heijokyo: 100 Questions & Answers about the Ancient Capital in Nara. CreateSpace Independent Publishing Platform. 2011.

External links

 Nara Palace Site Museum
 The Commemorative Events for the 1300th Anniversary (Available in Chinese, English, French, Korean and Japanese)
 Jô-Bô System of Heijô-Kyô
 Nara (Heijô-kyô) — The Capital of Japan in the 8th Century
 Takenaka Corporation on the reconstruction of the first Daigokuden Palace rebuilt at the Special Historical Site-Designated Heijokyu Ruins

Former capitals of Japan
Nara period
Planned capitals
Special Places of Scenic Beauty
Special Historic Sites